Fernando Recio Comí (born 17 December 1982) is a professional footballer who plays mainly as a central defender for Hong Kong Premier League club Lee Man.

Born in Spain, he spent most of his professional career with Kitchee in Hong Kong after signing in 2010, eventually going on to represent the Hong Kong national team.

Club career

Born in Barcelona, Catalonia, Recio only played amateur football in his country, representing UE Rapitenca, CF Amposta and CD Tortosa. In June 2010 he was signed by Kitchee SC in Hong Kong, reuniting with former teammate – at the first two clubs – Ubay Luzardo (also a stopper). The club's manager, compatriot Josep Gombau, had tried to acquire the player in the previous transfer window, but failed.

On 17 October 2013, general manager Ken Ng announced that Recio had renewed his contract until 2016. On 29 May of the following year he won the Hong Kong Player of the Year Award for 2013–14 season, receiving a HK$35,000 prize.

Following Kitchee's victory in the 2018–19 Hong Kong FA Cup, it was announced that Recio would leave the club. On 19 July 2019, the 36-year-old signed for Lee Man FC of the same country and league.

International career
Recio received his Hong Kong passport in October 2017, at the age of 34, alongside compatriots Dani Cancela and Jordi Tarrés. He made his debut for the national team on 5 October, in a 4–0 friendly win over Laos.

Career statistics

Club

International

Honours
Kitchee
Hong Kong Premier League: 2014–15, 2016–17, 2017–18
Hong Kong First Division: 2010–11, 2011–12, 2013–14
Hong Kong Senior Shield: 2016–17, 2018–19
Hong Kong FA Cup: 2011–12, 2012–13, 2014–15, 2016–17, 2017–18, 2018–19
Hong Kong Sapling Cup: 2017–18
Hong Kong League Cup: 2011–12, 2014–15, 2015–16

Individual
Hong Kong Footballer of the Year: 2014

References

External links

1982 births
Living people
Spanish emigrants to Hong Kong
Spanish footballers
Hong Kong footballers
Footballers from Barcelona
Naturalized footballers of Hong Kong
Association football defenders
Association football midfielders
Association football utility players
Tercera División players
Divisiones Regionales de Fútbol players
Hong Kong First Division League players
Hong Kong Premier League players
Kitchee SC players
Hong Kong Rangers FC players
Lee Man FC players
Hong Kong international footballers
Footballers at the 2018 Asian Games
Asian Games competitors for Hong Kong
Spanish expatriate footballers
Expatriate footballers in Hong Kong
Spanish expatriate sportspeople in Hong Kong